Blackadder is a series of four period British sitcoms, plus several one-off instalments, which originally aired on BBC One from 1983 to 1989. All television episodes starred Rowan Atkinson as the antihero Edmund Blackadder and Tony Robinson as Blackadder's dogsbody, Baldrick. Each series was set in a different historical period, with the two protagonists accompanied by different characters, though several reappear in one series or another, e.g., Melchett (Stephen Fry) and Lord Flashheart (Rik Mayall).

The first series, The Black Adder, was written by Richard Curtis and Rowan Atkinson, while subsequent series were written by Curtis and Ben Elton. The shows were produced by John Lloyd. In 2000, the fourth series, Blackadder Goes Forth, ranked at 16 in the 100 Greatest British Television Programmes, a list created by the British Film Institute. In a 2001 poll by Channel 4, Edmund Blackadder was ranked third on their list of the 100 Greatest TV Characters. In the 2004 TV poll to find Britain's Best Sitcom, Blackadder was voted the second-best British sitcom of all time, topped by Only Fools and Horses. It was also ranked as the 9th-best TV show of all time by Empire magazine.

Premise

Each series is set in a different period of British history, beginning in 1485 and ending in 1917, and comprises six half-hour episodes. Blackadder follows the misfortunes of Edmund Blackadder (played by Atkinson), who in each series is a member of the same British family dynasty. It is implied in each series that the Blackadder character is a descendant of the previous one (the end theme lyrics of series 2 episode "Head" specify that he is the great-grandson of the previous), although it is never specified how or when any of the Blackadders (who are usually bachelors) managed to father children.

In series one, Edmund Blackadder is not particularly bright, and is much the intellectual inferior of his servant, Baldrick (played by Tony Robinson). However, in subsequent series the positions are reversed: Blackadder is clever, shrewd, scheming and manipulative while Baldrick is extremely dim. Each incarnation of Blackadder and Baldrick is also saddled with tolerating the presence of a dimwitted aristocrat. In the first two series this is Lord Percy Percy, played by Tim McInnerny. Hugh Laurie plays the role in the third and fourth series, as Prince George, Prince Regent, and Lieutenant George, respectively.

The first series, made in 1983, was called The Black Adder and was set in the fictional reign of "Richard IV". The second series, Blackadder II (1986), was set during the reign of Elizabeth I. Blackadder the Third (1987) was set during the late 18th and early 19th centuries in the reign of George III, and Blackadder Goes Forth (1989) was set in 1917 in the trenches of the Great War.

Episodes

Series 1: The Black Adder

The Black Adder, the first series of Blackadder, was written by Richard Curtis and Rowan Atkinson and produced by John Lloyd. It originally aired on BBC1 from 15 June 1983 to 20 July 1983, and was a joint production with the Australian Seven Network.

Set in 1485 at the end of the British Middle Ages, the series is written as an alternative history in which Richard III won the Battle of Bosworth Field only to be mistaken for someone else and murdered, and is succeeded by Richard IV (Brian Blessed), one of the Princes in the Tower. The series follows the exploits of Richard IV's unfavoured second son Edmund, the Duke of Edinburgh (who calls himself "The Black Adder") in his various attempts to increase his standing with his father and his eventual quest to overthrow him. Guest appearances in this series include Peter Cook as King Richard III, Russell Enoch as the Duke of Winchester, Miriam Margolyes as the Infanta Maria Escalosa of Spain (with Jim Broadbent as her interpreter), Frank Finlay as the Witchsmeller Pursuivant, Valentine Dyall as Lord Angus, Stephen Frost and Mark Arden as guards, and Rik Mayall as Mad Gerald.

Conceived while Atkinson and Curtis were working on Not the Nine O'Clock News, the series dealt comically with a number of aspects of medieval life in Britain: witchcraft, royal succession, European relations, the Crusades, and the conflict between the Church and the Crown. Along with the secret history, many historical events portrayed in the series were anachronistic (for example, Constantinople had already fallen to the Ottoman Empire in 1453, predating the events in the episode by 33 years); this dramatic license would continue in the subsequent Blackadders. The filming of the series was highly ambitious, with a large cast and much location shooting. The series also featured Shakespearean dialogue, often adapted for comic effect; the end credits featured the words "Additional Dialogue by William Shakespeare".

Series 2: Blackadder II

Blackadder II is set in England during the reign of Queen Elizabeth I (1558–1603), who is portrayed by Miranda Richardson. The principal character is Edmund, Lord Blackadder, the great-grandson of the original Black Adder. During the series, he regularly deals with the Queen, her obsequious Lord Chamberlain Lord Melchett (Stephen Fry) – his rival for the Queen's affections – and the Queen's demented former nanny Nursie (Patsy Byrne). Guest appearances in the series include Tom Baker as Captain Redbeard Rum, Simon Jones as Sir Walter Raleigh, Ronald Lacey as the Bishop of Bath and Wells, and Miriam Margoyles as Blackadder's aunt, Lady Whiteadder. The series also features two appearances by Hugh Laurie (as Simon Partridge, a friend of Blackadder's, in the episode "Beer"; and as Prince Ludwig the Indestructible in the series' finale "Chains"), as well as the first appearance of Gabrielle Glaister as "Bob", and of Rik Mayall as Lord Flashheart.

Following the BBC's request for improvements (and a severe budget reduction), several changes were made. The second series was the first to establish the familiar Blackadder character: cunning, shrewd and witty, in sharp contrast to the first series' bumbling Prince Edmund. To reduce the cost of production, it was shot with virtually no outdoor scenes (the first series was shot largely on location) and several frequently used indoor sets, such as the Queen's throne room and Blackadder's front room.

A quote from this series ranked number three in a list of the top 25 television "putdowns" of the last 40 years by the Radio Times magazine: "The eyes are open, the mouth moves, but Mr. Brain has long since departed, hasn't he, Percy?"

Series 3: Blackadder the Third

Blackadder the Third is set in the late 18th and early 19th centuries, a period known as the Regency. In the series, Edmund Blackadder Esquire is the butler to the Prince Regent, the Prince of Wales (the prince is played by Hugh Laurie as a complete fop and idiot). Despite Edmund's respected intelligence and abilities, he has no personal fortune to speak of, apart from his frequently fluctuating wage packet (as well, it seems, from stealing and selling off the Prince's socks) from the Prince: "If I'm running short of cash, all I have to do is go upstairs and ask Prince Fathead for a rise." The episode titles were puns on Jane Austen novels.

As well as Rowan Atkinson and Tony Robinson in their usual roles, this series starred Hugh Laurie as the Prince Regent and Helen Atkinson-Wood as Mrs. Miggins. The series features Dr. Samuel Johnson (Robbie Coltrane); William Pitt the Younger (Simon Osborne); the French Revolution (with Chris Barrie, Tim McInnerny as the Scarlet Pimpernel, and Nigel Planer); hammy theatrical actors (Kenneth Connor and Hugh Paddick); a squirrel-hating cross-dressing highwayman (Miranda Richardson); and a duel with the Duke of Wellington (Stephen Fry).

Series 4: Blackadder Goes Forth

This series is set in 1917, on the Western Front in the trenches of the First World War. Another "big push" is planned, and Captain Blackadder's one goal is to avoid being killed, but his schemes always land him back in the trenches. Blackadder is joined by his batman Private S. Baldrick (Tony Robinson) and idealistic Edwardian twit Lieutenant George (Hugh Laurie). General Melchett (Stephen Fry) rallies his troops from a French château  from the front, where he is aided and abetted by his assistant, Captain Kevin Darling (Tim McInnerny), pencil-pusher supreme and Blackadder's nemesis, whose name is played on for maximum comedic value. Guest appearances in this series include Stephen Frost as the leader of a firing squad detail, Miranda Richardson as Nurse Mary Fletcher-Brown, two further appearances of Gabrielle Glaister as "Bob" (in this series, a young woman who pretended to be a boy in order to join the army), Rik Mayall appearing as Royal Flying Corps Squadron Commander The Lord Flasheart, Adrian Edmondson as Baron Manfred von Richthofen (aka "The Red Baron"), and Geoffrey Palmer as Field Marshal Douglas Haig.

The series' tone is somewhat darker than the other Blackadders; it details the deprivations of trench warfare as well as the incompetence and life-wasting strategies of the top brass. For example, Baldrick is reduced to cooking rats and making coffee from mud, while General Melchett hatches a plan for the troops to walk very slowly toward the German lines, because "it'll be the last thing Fritz will expect."

The final episode, "Goodbyeee", is known for being extraordinarily poignant for a comedy – especially the final scene, which sees the main characters (Blackadder, Baldrick, George, and Darling) finally going "over the top" and charging off into the fog and smoke of no man's land presumably to die. In a list of the 100 Greatest British Television Programmes, drawn up by the British Film Institute in 2000 and voted for by industry professionals, Blackadder Goes Forth was placed 16th.

Specials

Pilot episode

The Blackadder pilot was shot but never broadcast on terrestrial TV in the UK (although some scenes were shown in the 25th anniversary special Blackadder Rides Again). One notable difference in the pilot, as in many pilots, is the casting. Baldrick is played not by Tony Robinson, but by Philip Fox. Another significant difference is that the character of Prince Edmund presented in the pilot is much closer to the intelligent, conniving Blackadder of the later series than the snivelling, weak buffoon of the original. Set in the year 1582, the script of the pilot is roughly the same as the episode "Born to Be King", albeit with some different jokes, with some lines appearing in other episodes of the series.

Blackadder: The Cavalier Years

This special, set in the English Civil War, was shown as part of Comic Relief's Red Nose Day on Friday 5 February 1988. The 15-minute episode is set in November 1648, during the last days of the Civil War. Sir Edmund Blackadder and his servant, Baldrick, are the last two men loyal to the defeated King Charles I of England (played by Stephen Fry, portrayed as a soft-spoken, ineffective, naive character, with the voice and mannerisms of Charles I's namesake, the then Prince of Wales (now King Charles III). However, due to a misunderstanding between Oliver Cromwell (guest-star Warren Clarke) and Baldrick, the King is arrested and sent to the Tower of London. The rest of the episode revolves around Blackadder's attempts to save the King as well as improve his own standing.

Blackadder's Christmas Carol

The second special was broadcast on Friday 23 December 1988. In a twist on Charles Dickens' A Christmas Carol, Ebenezer Blackadder is the "kindest and loveliest" man in England. The Spirit of Christmas shows Blackadder the contrary antics of his ancestors and descendants, and reluctantly informs him that if he turns evil his descendants will enjoy power and fortune, while if he remains the same a future Blackadder will live shamefully subjugated to a future incompetent Baldrick. This remarkable encounter causes him to proclaim, "Bad guys have all the fun", and adopt the personality with which viewers are more familiar.

Blackadder: Back & Forth

Blackadder: Back & Forth was originally shown in the Millennium Dome in 2000, followed by a screening on Sky One in the same year (and later on BBC1). It is set on the turn of the millennium, and features Lord Blackadder placing a bet with his friends – modern versions of Queenie (Miranda Richardson), Melchett (Stephen Fry), George (Hugh Laurie) and Darling (Tim McInnerny) – that he has built a working time machine. While this is intended as a clever con trick, the machine surprisingly works, sending Blackadder and Baldrick back to the Cretaceous period, where they manage to cause the extinction of the dinosaurs through the use of Baldrick's best-worst-and-only pair of underpants as a weapon against a hungry T. Rex. Finding that Baldrick has forgotten to write dates on the machine's dials, the rest of the film follows their attempts to find their way back to 1999, often creating huge historical anomalies in the process that must be corrected before the end. The film includes cameo appearances from Kate Moss and Colin Firth.

The Big Night In

Broadcast in 2020 as part of Children in Need and Comic Relief's joint special The Big Night In during the COVID-19 pandemic, Fry resumed the role of Lord Melchett (an intellectually-brilliant version), Head of the Royal Household, under lockdown at Melchett Manor, to help Prince William deal with educating his children via Zoom and discussing Tiger King, before they both step outside to clap for the National Health Service. Melchett is said to be isolating with Lord Blackadder, both grandsons to their First World War counterparts.

Live stage performances

In 1998, as part of Prince Charles' 50th Birthday Gala televised on ITV, Atkinson returned to the Cavalier incarnation of Blackadder reading aloud a letter to the Privy Council of King Charles I. He colourfully refuses their invitation to stage a royal gala, calling such occasions "very, very, very dull" and asserting that there was "more musical talent on display when my servant Baldrick breaks wind."

In 2000, on the BBC's annual Royal Variety Performance, Atkinson portrayed Blackadder as a present-day officer in "Her Majesty's Royal Regiment of Shirkers" and delivered a monologue titled "Blackadder: The Army Years," proposing that Britain regain her former greatness by invading (or at least buying) France.

In 2012, as part of the Prince's Trust charity show We Are Most Amused, Atkinson and Robinson reprised their roles as Blackadder and Baldrick in a comedy sketch featuring Miranda Hart as leader of a government inquiry into the recent banking crisis. Blackadder, chief executive of a fictional British bank, appearing with Baldrick as his gardener, convinces the panel to publicly blame the entire crisis on Baldrick, to the latter's consternation.

Chronological order

Production

Series development
Rowan Atkinson and Richard Curtis developed the idea for the sitcom while working on Not the Nine O'Clock News. Eager to avoid comparisons to the critically acclaimed Fawlty Towers, they proposed the idea of a historical sitcom. An unaired pilot episode was made in 1982, and a six-episode series was commissioned. The budget for the series was considerable, with much location shooting particularly at Alnwick Castle in Northumberland and the surrounding countryside in February 1983. The series also used large casts of extras, horses and expensive medieval-style costumes. Atkinson has said about the making of the first series:

The first series was odd, it was very extravagant. It cost a million pounds for the six programmes ... [which] was a lot of money to spend ... It looked great, but it wasn't as consistently funny as we would have liked.

Due to the high cost of the first series, the then-controller of programming of BBC1, Michael Grade, was reluctant to sign off a second series without major improvements to the show and drastic cost-cutting, leaving a gap of three years between the two series. Atkinson did not wish to continue writing for the second series.

A chance meeting between Richard Curtis and comedian Ben Elton led to the decision to collaborate on a new series of Blackadder. Recognising the main faults of the first series, Curtis and Elton agreed that Blackadder II would be a studio-only production (along with the inclusion of a live audience during recording, instead of showing the episodes to an audience after taping). Besides adding a greater comedy focus, Elton suggested a major change in character emphasis: Baldrick would become the stupid sidekick, while Edmund Blackadder evolved into a cunning sycophant. This led to the familiar set-up that was maintained in the following series.

Only in the Back & Forth millennium special was the shooting once again on location, because this was a production with a budget estimated at £3 million, and was a joint venture between Tiger Aspect, Sky Television, the New Millennium Experience Company and the BBC, rather than the BBC alone.

Casting

Each series tended to feature the same set of regular actors in different period settings, although throughout the four series and specials, only Blackadder and Baldrick were constant characters. Several regular cast members recurred as characters with similar names, implying, like Blackadder, that they were descendants.

Recurring cast
Various actors have appeared in more than one of the Blackadder series and/or specials. These are:

Main cast
Rowan Atkinson as Edmund Blackadder, the series' protagonist.
Tony Robinson as S. Baldrick, his servant.
Stephen Fry as Melchett in two series, first as Lord Melchett, the sycophantic adviser to Queen Elizabeth I in series two and secondly as General Melchett, a blustering buffoon and presumed descendant in series four. Fry also appeared as Arthur Wellesley, The Duke of Wellington in series three and as various characters in Blackadder Back & Forth.
Tim McInnerny as Lord Percy Percy, Blackadder's dimwitted sidekick in series one and two before a change of character to antagonistic rival Captain Kevin Darling in series four. He also appeared as The Scarlet Pimpernel (alias Lord Topper and Le Comte de Frou Frou) for one episode in the third series, and reprised his role as Darling in Blackadder: Back & Forth.
Hugh Laurie played George in series three and four, first as The Prince Regent, and later Lieutenant George in series four. Laurie also appeared twice in series two; firstly as Simon "Farters Parters" Partridge and then as Prince Ludwig the Indestructible in the final instalment of Blackadder II. He reprised his role as George in Blackadder: Back & Forth.
Miranda Richardson was only a regular cast member for series two, in which she played Queen Elizabeth I, reprising the role in Blackadder's Christmas Carol and Back & Forth. However, she also played significant one-off roles as Amy Hardwood (a.k.a. The Shadow) in "Amy and Amiability" in the third series and Mary Fletcher-Brown, a dutiful nurse in "General Hospital" from the fourth. She reappeared as Queenie and additional characters in Christmas Carol and Back and Forth.

Non-recurring cast
Brian Blessed, Elspet Gray and Robert East appeared in all six episodes of the first series as the Black Adder's father, mother and brother respectively. Gray had also appeared in the non-broadcast pilot.
Patsy Byrne played Nursie in all six episodes of Blackadder II, but never featured in either of the subsequent series, either as a regular character or one-off. She briefly reprised the character in Blackadder: Back & Forth and Blackadder's Christmas Carol.
Helen Atkinson-Wood played the role of Mrs. Miggins in all six episodes of Blackadder the Third, but did not appear again in the series, although the character was mentioned several times in Blackadder II and in the final episode of Blackadder Goes Forth.

Guest cast
Ben Elton's arrival after the first series heralded the more frequent recruitment of comic actors from the alternative comedy era for guest appearances, including Robbie Coltrane, Rik Mayall (who had appeared in the final episode of the first series as "Mad Gerald"), Adrian Edmondson, Nigel Planer, Mark Arden, Stephen Frost, Chris Barrie and Jeremy Hardy. Elton himself played an anarchist in Blackadder the Third.

Gabrielle Glaister played Bob, an attractive girl who poses as a man, in both series 2 and 4. Rik Mayall plays Lord Flashheart, a vulgar friend in his first appearance and then a successful rival of Blackadder in later episodes of series 2 and 4. He also played a decidedly Flashheart-like Robin Hood in Back & Forth. Lee Cornes also appeared in an episode of all three Curtis-Elton series. He appeared as a guard in the episode "Chains" of Blackadder II; as the poet Shelley in the episode "Ink and Incapability' of Blackadder the Third; and as firing squad soldier Private Fraser in the episode "Corporal Punishment" of Blackadder Goes Forth.

More established actors, some at the veteran stage of their careers, were also recruited for roles. These included Peter Cook, John Grillo, Simon Jones, Tom Baker, Jim Broadbent, Hugh Paddick, Frank Finlay, Kenneth Connor, Bill Wallis, Ronald Lacey, Roger Blake, Denis Lill, Warren Clarke and Geoffrey Palmer, who played Field Marshal Sir Douglas Haig in "Goodbyeee", the final episode of Blackadder Goes Forth. Miriam Margolyes played three different guest roles: The Spanish Infanta in The Queen of Spain's Beard, Lady Whiteadder in Beer, and Queen Victoria in Blackadder's Christmas Carol.

Unusually for a sitcom based loosely on factual events and in the historical past, a man was recruited for one episode essentially to play himself. Political commentator Vincent Hanna played a character billed as "his own great-great-great grandfather" in the episode "Dish and Dishonesty" of Blackadder the Third. Hanna was asked to take part because the scene was of a by-election in which Baldrick was a candidate and, in the style of modern television, Hanna gave a long-running "live" commentary of events at the count (and interviewed candidates and election agents) to a crowd through the town hall window.

Theme tune
Howard Goodall's theme tune has the same melody throughout all the series, but is played in roughly the style of the period in which it is set. It is performed mostly with trumpets and timpani in The Black Adder, the fanfares used suggesting typical medieval court fanfares; with a combination of recorder, string quartet and electric guitar in Blackadder II (the end theme, with different lyrics each time reflecting on the episode's events, was sung by a countertenor); on oboe, cello and harpsichord (in the style of a minuet) for Blackadder the Third; by The Band of the 3rd Battalion, Royal Anglian Regiment in Blackadder Goes Forth; sung by carol singers in Blackadder's Christmas Carol; and by an orchestra in Blackadder: The Cavalier Years and Blackadder: Back & Forth.

Awards
In 2000, the fourth series, Blackadder Goes Forth, ranked at 16 in the "100 Greatest British Television Programmes", a list created by the British Film Institute. In 2004, a BBC TV poll for "Britain's Best Sitcom", Blackadder was voted the second best British sitcom of all time, topped by Only Fools and Horses. It was also ranked as the 20th Best TV Show of All Time by Empire magazine.

Future

Despite regular statements denying any plans for a fifth series, cast members are regularly asked about the possibility of a new series.

In January 2005, Tony Robinson told ITV's This Morning that Rowan Atkinson was more keen than he has been in the past to do a fifth series, set in the 1960s (centred on a rock band called the "Black Adder Five", with Baldrick – a.k.a. 'Bald Rick' – as the drummer). In the documentary Blackadder Rides Again, Robinson stated that the series would present Blackadder as the bastard son of Queen Elizabeth II and running a Beatles-like rock band. Rowan Atkinson, Tony Robinson, Hugh Laurie, Stephen Fry, Tim McInnerny and Miranda Richardson would have reprised their roles, and reportedly, Brian Blessed, Elspet Gray and Robert East would have returned from the first series to play Blackadder's biological family. Robinson in a stage performance 1 June 2007, again mentioned this idea, but in the context of a movie.

One idea mentioned by Curtis was that it was Baldrick who had accidentally assassinated John F. Kennedy. However, aside from a brief mention in June 2005,
there have been no further announcements from the BBC that a new series is being planned. Furthermore, in November 2005, Rowan Atkinson told BBC Breakfast that, although he would very much like to do a new series set in Colditz or another prisoner-of-war camp during World War II, something which both he and Stephen Fry reiterated at the end of Blackadder Rides Again, the chances of it happening are extremely slim.

There were a couple of ideas that had previously floated for the fifth series. Batadder was intended to be a parody of Batman with Baldrick as the counterpart of Robin (suggested by John Lloyd). This idea eventually came to surface as part of the Comic Relief sketch "Spider-Plant Man" in 2005, with Atkinson as the title hero, Robinson as Robin, Jim Broadbent as Batman and Rachel Stevens as Mary Jane. Star Adder was to be set in space in the future (suggested by Atkinson), though this too was touched upon in Blackadder's Christmas Carol.

On 10 April 2007, Hello! reported that Atkinson was moving forward with his ideas for a fifth series. He said, "I like the idea of him being a prisoner of war in Colditz. That would have the right level of authority and hierarchy which is apparent in all the Blackadders."

A post on BlackAdderHall.com by Ben Elton in early 2007 said that Blackadder would return in some form, whether it be a TV series or film. Elton has since not given any more information on the putative Blackadder 5.

During an interview in August 2007 about his film Mr. Bean's Holiday, Atkinson was asked about the possibility of a further Blackadder series, to which the simple reply "No, no chance" was given:

There was a plan for a film set in the Russian revolution, a very interesting one called The Red Adder. He would have been a lieutenant in the Secret Police. Then the revolution happened and at the end he is in the same office doing the same job but just the colours on his uniform have changed. It was quite a sweet idea and we got quite a long way with it but in the end it died a death.

Stephen Fry has expressed the view that, since the series went out on such a good "high", a film might not be a good idea.

During his June 2007 stage performance, chronicled on the Tony Robinson's Cunning Night Out DVD, Robinson states that, after filming the Back & Forth special, the general idea was to reunite for another special in 2010. Robinson jokingly remarked that Hugh Laurie's success on House may make that difficult.

At the end of Blackadder Rides Again, Robinson asked Tim McInnerny if he would do another series and he responded "no", because he thought people would not want to see them as they are now and would rather remember them for how they were. In the same documentary, Rowan Atkinson voiced his similar view; 'Times past; that's what they were!' However, Miranda Richardson and Tony Robinson expressed enthusiasm towards the idea of a series set in the Wild West, whilst John Lloyd favoured an idea for a series with a Neanderthal Blackadder. Lastly, Stephen Fry suggested a series set in a prisoner of war camp during World War II, but later remarked that "perhaps it's best to leave these things as a memory."

On 28 November 2012, Rowan Atkinson reprised the role at the "We are most amused" comedy gala for the Prince's Trust at the Royal Albert Hall. He was joined by Tony Robinson as Baldrick. The sketch involved Blackadder as CEO of Melchett, Melchett and Darling bank facing an enquiry over the banking crisis.

In August 2015, Tony Robinson said in an interview "I do think a new series of Blackadder is on the cards. I have spoken to virtually all the cast about this now. The only problem is Hugh [Laurie]'s fee. He's a huge star now." However, in October 2018, Richard Curtis "dashed hopes" that the show would return for a fifth series.

In December 2020, Rowan Atkinson told the Radio Times:

I don't actually like the process of making anything – with the possible exception of Blackadder. Because the responsibility for making that series funny was on many shoulders, not just mine. Blackadder represented the creative energy we all had in the '80s. To try to replicate that 30 years on wouldn't be easy.

Home media

All series and many of the specials are available on VHS tapes and DVD. Many are also available on BBC audio cassette. As of 2008, a "Best of BBC" edition box set is available containing all four major series together with Blackadder's Christmas Carol and Back & Forth. All four series and the Christmas special are also available for download on iTunes.

VHS releases
On 5 February 1990, BBC Enterprises Ltd released the first series on two single VHS tapes.

On 2 October 1989, BBC Enterprises Ltd released the second series on two single VHS tapes.

On 6 March 1989, BBC Enterprises Ltd released the third series on two single VHS tapes.

On 10 September 1990, BBC Enterprises Ltd released the fourth and final series on two single VHS tapes.

On 7 September 1992, all eight single Blackadder video releases were re-released as four "complete" double VHS releases. The four entire series videos were re-released as single VHS tape releases on 2 October 1995.

On 5 January 1998, five episodes of the first two series were released on a 15-rated VHS tape compilation by BBC Worldwide Ltd.

On 4 November 1991, Blackadder's Christmas Carol was released on a single VHS tape release rated PG (Cat. No. BBCV 4646).

Single DVD releases

Box set DVD releases

Stamps
Royal Mail is due to issue a set of special stamps celebrating Blackadder on 17 May 2023.

References

Literature
 Richard Curtis, Ben Elton, and Rowan Atkinson, Blackadder: The Whole Damn Dynasty 1485–1917 (Michael Joseph, 1998). . Being the – almost – complete scripts of the four regular series.
 Chris Howarth, and Steve Lyons, Cunning: The Blackadder Programme Guide (Virgin Publishing, 2002). . A cheap unofficial episode guide.
 Richard Curtis and Ben Elton, Blackadder: Back & Forth (Penguin Books, 2000). . A script book with copious photographs from the most recent outing ,and additional material from Kevin Cecil & Andy Riley.
 J.F. Roberts, The True History of the Black Adder: The Unadulterated Tale of the Creation of a Comedy Legend (Preface publishing, 2012). . A 420-page officially endorsed full history of the Blackadder episodes and characters, as well as its birth, its writers and actors, and all the specials – plus Curtis' script for unproduced Christmas special 'Blackadder In Bethlehem'.

External links

1980s British sitcoms
1983 British television series debuts
Alternate history television series
BBC black comedy television shows
BBC television sitcoms
Blackadder
British parody television series
English-language television shows
Period television series
Television series by BBC Studios
Television series created by Rowan Atkinson
Television series created by Richard Curtis